The Río Grande (Spanish for "great river") is a river located on the island of Tierra del Fuego.
 
It arises in the Chilean (western) part of the island and flows in a generally eastward direction, through the Argentine part and into the Argentine Sea. At its mouth lies the city of Río Grande, Argentina.

References 

Rivers of Argentina
Rivers of Chile
Rivers of Magallanes Region
Isla Grande de Tierra del Fuego
International rivers of South America
Rivers of Tierra del Fuego Province, Argentina